Dicladispa is a genus of beetles belonging to the family Chrysomelidae.

The species of this genus are found in Africa, Southern Europe and Southeastern Asia.

Species

Species:

Dicladispa admiranda 
Dicladispa aerea 
Dicladispa aereipennis

References

Cassidinae
Chrysomelidae genera